Bigwang  is an upcoming South Korean film, directed by Lee Ji-won, starring Ryu Seung-ryong and Ha Ji-won.

Synopsis 
A star couple Jung-goo and Nam-mi, who were loved by the public, fall into hell because of a child Dong-joo who suddenly appears.

Cast 
 Ryu Seung-ryong as Hwang Jung-goo, a former baseball player who lives with a splendid past behind him
 Ha Ji-won as Nam-mi, a living entertainer who was once the top star of the time
 Kim Si-a as Dong-joo, Hwang Jung-goo's daughter
 Kim Hae-sook as Jung-goo's mother
 Kim Sun-young as Jung-goo's older sister
 Kim Young-min as Jung-goo's brother-in-law
 Yoo Jae-myung as Kwak Chang-gi, the head of a large corporation and owner of the team where Jung-gu worked in the past
 Park Myung-hoon as Wang Byun, a longtime fan of Jung-goo
 Lee Joo-won as Gwan-woo, a detective in charge of the case in which Dong-ju is involved.

Production 
It was originally scheduled to start filming in June 2020, but it was postponed due to COVID-19 pandemic. Filming began in June 23, 2021 and concluded in September 19, 2021.

References

External links
 
 
 

Upcoming films
2020s South Korean films
2020s Korean-language films
2020s drama films
South Korean drama films
Film productions suspended due to the COVID-19 pandemic